Valična Vas is a village in the Municipality of Ivančna Gorica in central Slovenia. The area is part of the historical region of Lower Carniola. The municipality is now included in the Central Slovenia Statistical Region. 

The local church is dedicated to Saint Martin and belongs to the Parish of Zagradec.

References

External links

Valična Vas on Geopedia

Populated places in the Municipality of Ivančna Gorica